Beatrice "Nancy" Lyons (born 12 April 1930), also known by her married name Beatrice Welch, is an Australian former breaststroke swimmer of the 1940s and 1950s who won a silver medal in the 200m breaststroke at the 1948 Summer Olympics.

Coached in Brisbane by Mabel Springfield, the chaperone for female athletes on the Australian 1928 Summer Olympics team, Lyons nearly missed the London games. Although she was one of 25 swimmers chosen for the team, due to post-war financial difficulties, she was forced to raise the money herself to pay her fare to the Olympics. This was achieved and she finished half a second behind the world record-holder Petronella van Vliet of the Netherlands. This was two months after changing from the traditional breaststroke technique to the butterfly stroke, which was at that stage permitted due to a loophole in the rules.

At the 1950 British Empire Games in Auckland, Lyons was beaten into second place by Scottish swimmer Helen Gordon in the 220-yard breaststroke, and won gold in the 3×110-yard medley relay with Judy-Joy Davies and Marjorie McQuade (as only three different strokes were in existence at the time). At the 1952 Summer Olympics in Helsinki, Lyons finished last in her semi-final with a time more than six seconds outside her best, set in the London final four years earlier. She retired after the games.

See also
 List of Olympic medalists in swimming (women)

References

 

1930 births
Living people
Sportswomen from Queensland
Olympic swimmers of Australia
Swimmers at the 1948 Summer Olympics
Swimmers at the 1952 Summer Olympics
Australian female breaststroke swimmers
Swimmers from Brisbane
Medalists at the 1948 Summer Olympics
Olympic silver medalists for Australia
Olympic silver medalists in swimming
Commonwealth Games medallists in swimming
Commonwealth Games gold medallists for Australia
Commonwealth Games silver medallists for Australia
Swimmers at the 1950 British Empire Games
20th-century Australian women
21st-century Australian women
Medallists at the 1950 British Empire Games